{{Infobox television
| image         = Local on the 8s logo.png
| alt_name      = Local Forecast (1982–1996, 1998–2002) 
| creator       = The Weather Channel
| based_on      = Weather forecast
| narrated      = Dan Chandler (1987–1995)Allen Jackson (2000–2015; IntelliStar and WeatherSTAR XL systems only)Jim Cantore (2010–present; IntelliSTAR 2 systems only)
| composer      = Various
| country       = United States
| language      = English
| num_seasons   =
| num_episodes  = 
| list_episodes = 
| runtime       = Varied between 30 seconds and 5 minutes, depending on the flavor (1982–1998)1-2 minutes (1998-2013) 1 minute (2013–present)
| company       = 
| distributor   = 
| network       = The Weather Channel
| first_aired   = 
| last_aired    = present
| preceded_by   = 
| followed_by   = 
| related       =  
}}Local on the 8s (or the Local Forecast) is a program segment that airs on the American network The Weather Channel. It provides viewers with information on current and forecasted weather conditions for their respective area; a version of this segment is also available on the channel's national satellite feed that features forecasts for each region of the United States. The name comes from the timing of the segment, as airs at timeslots that end in "8" (examples: 9:18 and 12:48); because of this manner of scheduling, the forecast segments air on the channel in ten-minute intervals. From 2006-2013, each forecast segment had usually been preceded by a promo for one of The Weather Channel's programs or services, leading into the segment with the announcer stating "And now, your Local on the 8s". On November 12, 2013, the promo segment was replaced by an intro that was built into the Local on the 8s segment. As of April 2018, the segment airs at approximately :18 past each hour. It also usually airs at approximately :48 past each hour during live Weather Channel broadcasts.

History
The Weather Channel has carried a local weather forecast segment since the network was launched on May 2, 1982. The segments were originally seen either every five minutes or eight times an hour at various times (airing more frequently in the morning and less frequently at night). The structure of scheduling the segments six times an hour at times ending in "8" was implemented in mid-1995. The "Local on the 8s" name was first used on April 21, 1996 to coincide with a sweeping revamp of the channel's on-air presentation; The Weather Channel filed for a trademark on the name on June 24, 1997. The name has caused confusion in the New York City market, as CBS Corporation's television and radio combination of WCBS-TV and WCBS use "traffic and weather on the 8s" to refer to the combined traffic and weather segments featured on those stations (which appear on WCBS-TV only during its morning newscasts and on WCBS radio at all hours).

Forecasts are generated by a WeatherStar machine, a proprietary hardware system in the form of a computerized unit that is installed in a headend at the facilities of local pay television providers that carry the channel. Weather information is received from the vertical blanking interval of the TWC video feed and from data transmitted via satellite, which is then sent to the WeatherStar unit that inserts the localized data over the TWC feed. The WeatherStar systems are capable of adding or removing segments shown within the main local forecast segment, with the common exception of the extended forecast; these customized segments are referred to as "flavors," which allow variabilities in the weather graphics displayed during each local forecast segment, resulting in certain types of specialized weather data appearing only at specific times or lengths. , the length of these flavors is uniformally one minute; flavor lengths previously varied between 30 seconds and two minutes prior to April 2013 and extended flavors of three to six minutes were previously included between the late 1980s and the mid-1990s.

As of April 2018, the segment airs at approximately :18 past each hour. It also usually airs at approximately :48 past each hour during live Weather Channel broadcasts.

Music
Pop and smooth jazz music is regularly played during the "Local on the 8s" segments; the music that is heard over the national feed's forecast segments is also transmitted over the localized segments generated by the STAR headend units. The Weather Channel released its own Smooth Jazz CD in 2007, The Weather Channel Presents: The Best of Smooth Jazz'', based on collections of popular music played during the "Local On the 8s" segments. It peaked at #1 on Billboard's Top Contemporary Jazz charts that year.

See also
WeatherStar
IntelliStar
Weather Star XL
Weatherscan
The Weather Channel

References

External links
The Weather Channel

The Weather Channel original programming
1982 American television series debuts
1980s American television series
1990s American television series
2000s American television series
2010s American television series
2020s American television series